The First Congregational Church of Milbank is a historic church in Milbank, South Dakota.  It has also been known as Congregational Church of Christ.  It was built in 1883 and was added to the National Register of Historic Places in 1978.

It is operated by the Grant County Historical Society.

It is currently affiliated with the United Church of Christ (UCC).

References

Churches on the National Register of Historic Places in South Dakota
Gothic Revival church buildings in South Dakota
Churches completed in 1883
Churches in Grant County, South Dakota
National Register of Historic Places in Grant County, South Dakota